Singly-fed electric machine is a broad term which covers ordinary electric motors and electric generators. 
Such machines have only one external connection to the windings, and thus are said to be singly fed.

See also
Doubly-fed electric machine
Rotary converter

References

Electric motors
Electrical generators